The 2007–08 Egyptian Premier League started on 13 August 2007, and finished on 22 May 2008. Al Ahly were crowned champions for the fourth year in a row and for the thirty third time in total since the league started in 1948.

Clubs 
 Al Ahly
 Al-Aluminium
 Asmant Suez
 Baladeyet Al-Mahalla
 ENPPI
 Ghazl Al Mehalla
 El-Jaish
 Haras El Hodood
 Al Ismaili
 Al Itthad Al Sakandary
 Al Masry
 Al Mokawloon
 Itesalat
 Petrojet
 Tersana
 Al Zamalek

League table 

 Top 2 qualify to CAF African Champions League.
 Egyptian Cup winner & 3rd place qualify to CAF Cup.

Top goal scorers

See also
 List of football clubs in Egypt

0
1
Egypt